Sir William Hodges, 1st Baronet (c. 1645–1714), of Winchester Street, London, was an English merchant and Whig politician who sat in the English and British House of Commons from 1705 to 1710.

Early life

Hodges was the son  of John Hodges  of Cotherstock or Cotterstock, Northamptonshire. His father died in 1665. He married by licence on 25 April 1681, Sarah Hall, daughter of Joseph Hall, merchant, of London and Ballasore, Bengal. He resided in 1681 in Mincing Lane.

Career
Hodges acquired a fortune in the Spanish trade, and was in partnership at Cadiz with Christopher Hague, Ellis Terrell, and the Hon. Henry Bertie, according to his will. During the Nine Years' War he extended credit to the government, accepting a bill for £300,000, for the use of the English fleet under the command of Admiral Edward Russell.  He was created baronet  on 31 March 1697.

Hodges became a director of the Bank of England in 1703. He was returned as a Whig Member of Parliament for Mitchell at the 1705 English general election. He was returned again at the 1708 British general election but did not stand at the 1710 British general election.

Death and legacy
Hodges had a house in Winchester Street, near Austin Friars when he died on 31 July 1714. He was buried on 6 August at St Katherine Coleman in Fenchurch Street. James Peller Malcolm describes his funeral, which was of unusual grandeur, with forty-two noblemen's coaches following the procession. He had an only son, Joseph, who succeeded to the baronetcy. Lady Hodges died in 1717.

Notes

Attribution

1645 births
1714 deaths
English merchants
Members of the pre-1707 English Parliament for constituencies in Cornwall
Baronets in the Baronetage of England
English MPs 1705–1707
British MPs 1707–1708
British MPs 1708–1710
Members of the Parliament of Great Britain for constituencies in Cornwall
People associated with the Bank of England